Archuleta is a unique family name with origins in Spain. The surname ranked 2,762 out of 88,799 in the United States.

Origin
The name Archuleta is a Castillian derivation of Basque Arechuleta, which ultimately comes from the place name Arechavaleta. The placename uses the Basque words "(h)aritz" (oak tree), "zabal" (wide) and "eta" (indicating plurality), with the combined meaning of "wide place where oak trees grow."  It is unknown why the "e" in Arechuleta was ultimately dropped.  The family lineage can be traced all the way back to Queen Isabella of Spain.

Family crest

People with the surname
Adam Archuleta (born 1977), American football player
Shannon Archuleta (born 1977), American Technology Leader
David Archuleta (born 1990), American singer
Eppie Archuleta (1922–2014), American weaver
Felipe Archuleta (1910-1991), American folk artist
Katherine Archuleta (born c, 1949), American political executive

Places with the name "Archuleta"
 Archuleta County, Colorado.
 Archuleta, New Mexico.

Further reading
 Dictionary of American Family Names, Oxford University Press,

References

Basque-language surnames